The Truth: Heard Live at the Blue Note is a live album by jazz drummer Elvin Jones recorded in 1999 and released on the Half Note label in 2004.

Reception 
The Allmusic review stated "All of the musicians are in top form and were clearly inspired to be playing with Elvin Jones. Although falling short of being a classic, this set has many bright moments". The All About Jazz review stated "The Truth is one of Jones' last recorded performances, certainly his last as a leader. It is a fitting epitaph to an artist who inspired legions of drummers and, with Coltrane, helped push forward the boundaries of modern music. He is missed" The JazzTimes review stated "Recorded in 1999, when he was at full strength, this was a night for hard blowing at the Blue Note... The Truth preserves one ordinary night in a club among thousands in the career of Elvin Jones, and it is important enough".

Track listing
All compositions by Elvin Jones except as indicated
 "E.J.'s Blues" - 8:13 
 "Straight No Chaser" (Thelonious Monk) - 7:35 
 "Body and Soul" (Edward Heyman, Robert Sour, Frank Eyton, Johnny Green) - 9:53 
 "Truth" (Keiko Jones) - 7:25 
 "A Lullaby of Itsugo Village" (Traditional) - 7:40 
 "Wise One" (John Coltrane) - 12:16 
 "Three Card Molly" - 7:52

Personnel
Elvin Jones  - drums
Darren Barrett - trumpet
Robin Eubanks - trombone  
Michael Brecker - saxophone
Antoine Roney - saxophone
Carlos McKinney - piano
Gene Perla - bass
Steven Bensusan - Executive Producer
Andy Bigan - Assistant
Greg Calbi - Mastering
Chaz Clifton - Assistant
Jon D'Uva - Digital Editing
Jack Kreisberg - Audio Production, Producer
Steve Remote - Audio Engineer, Coordination, Engineer, Mixing

References

Elvin Jones live albums
2004 live albums
Albums recorded at the Blue Note Jazz Club